Ragnar Östberg (14 July 1866 – 5 February 1945) was a Swedish architect who is best known for designing Stockholm City Hall.

Biography
Östberg was born in Stockholm, Sweden. His parents were  Carl Östberg and Erika Kindahl. Between 1884 and 1891, he first studied at KTH Royal Institute of Technology. In  1888, he studied at the Royal Swedish Academy of Fine Arts. He had an internship with architect Isak Gustaf Clason (1856–1930).  In 1893 he visited the World's Columbian Exposition in Chicago and in 1896 he went on a three-year study trip to, among others, England, France, Italy and Greece. Dating from the early 1900s, he lived and worked in Umeå in northern Sweden. Scharinska villan in Umeå is considered one of Östberg's best works during his youth.

Östberg became the most famous architect within the so-called "national romanticist" movement in Sweden. His body of work from the period ranges from public buildings, such as Stockholm City Hall, to mansions for influential families at the turn of the century, such as Scharinska villan or Nedre Manilla, built for members of the Bonnier family.

Buildings 
 Nedre Manilla, Djurgården, Stockholm
 Villa Ekarne (1905), Djurgården, Stockholm
 Villa Pauli, Djursholm (1905)
 Scharinska villan, Umeå (1905)
 Aschanska villan, Umeå (1906)
 Teaterhuset, Umeå (1906–1907)
 Prinsvillan, Djursholm, Danderyd (1909)
 Östermalms läroverk, "Östra Real", Stockholm (1906–1910)
 Patent- och registeringsverket, Stockholm (1911–1921)
 Stockholm City Hall (1923)
 Krematorium, Helsingborg (1929)
 Riksbron (bridge), Stockholm (1926–1930)
 The rebuilt palace on the islet of Strömsborg (1929–1930)
 Värmlands nation in Uppsala (1930)
 The Stagnelius School, Kalmar (1931–32)
 The Museum of Maritime History in Stockholm (1933–1936)
 The Zorn Museum in Mora (1938–1939)

Gallery

References

Other sources 
Cornell, Elias  (1966) Ragnar Östberg - en svensk arkitekt 
Söderberg, Rolf (1955) Svenska Män och Kvinnor del 8 
Thelaus, Erik  (1983) Ragnar Östbergs byggnader i Umeå 
Monterumisi, Chiara  (2017)  Ragnar Östberg – Villa Geber, una casa nell’arcipelago. Ediz. Italian, English and Swedish,  In Edibus, Vicenza, 
Atmer, Ann Katrin Pihl (2011) Stockholms stadshus och arkitekten Ragnar Östberg  (Kultur Allmänlitteratur) 

1866 births
1945 deaths
People from Stockholm
KTH Royal Institute of Technology alumni
Recipients of the Royal Gold Medal
20th-century Swedish architects

Honorary Members of the Royal Academy
Recipients of the AIA Gold Medal